Gulshan is a thana situated in Dhaka, Bangladesh. It is an affluent residential and business neighbourhood; and is now home to a number of the city's restaurants, shopping centres, schools, banks, members' clubs and hosts the majority of embassies and high commissions in Bangladesh. Many Bangladeshi and international companies have their offices in Gulshan.

History 
In the place of this suburb there was an old village named Bhola. Gulshan was founded as a planned model town in 1961 with its own Pourashabha (municipal corporation), while the neighbouring Banani Model Town was founded in 1964. Gulshan Thana was established in 1972.
Gulshan Pourashabha was abolished in 1982. In 1984, Gulshan, along with Mirpur municipality, was absorbed into Dhaka.

The area was originally built with the purpose of being solely residential; however, over the years many commercial buildings have been set up in the area. Gulshan is now a mix of a serene residential area and also a city centre with shopping malls and commercial buildings. The Gulshan city centre only consists of Gulshan, Baridhara, Banani, and Niketan. The Thana of Gulshan also includes the neighborhood of Mohakhali to the southwest.

On 3 January 2017, at approximately 2:30 a.m. BST midnight, a fire broke out in a local market, DCC in Gulshan.

Geography 

The Gulshan Thana comprises an area of 53.59 km2, consisting of three wards (72, 73 and 74), 37 mouzas and 20 villages, including Gulshan Model Town, consisting of Gulshan circle 1 and circle 2, Banani Model Town, Baridhara Diplomatic Zone, Mohakhali, and Niketan Welfare Society. 50% of the area is residential, 20% commercial and 12% is the diplomatic area. 18% land in Gulshan consists of other areas, including slums, of which the biggest is the Karail slum and Gulshan Lake. Apart from the urban areas, the 37 mouzas of Gulshan Thana also contain 20 villages.

Gulshan is a commercial and residential area, originally meant for offices and embassies of diplomatic missions, as well as residences. The area has seen an upsurge in the number of high-rise buildings, restaurants, residential areas, modern markets and ice-cream parlors since the mid-1990s. The independent houses of the early 1970s that stood far from each other in Gulshan area have vanished because of the commercial boom, to the point that older residents claiming it is no longer a residential area.

Though Gulshan, Banani and Baridhara, as well as Uttara and other satellite towns like Bashundhara are relatively on higher lands, substantial parts of the Gulshan Thana area remained underwater for a prolonged duration during the 1998 Bangladesh floods. Dhaka Water Supply and Sewerage Authority (DWASA) conducted a survey to investigate the causes of and remedial measures in 1998 with particular focus on the Gulshan Lake and the Gulshan and Banani canals. Flood water runoff flows into these water bodies practically turning these into buffer flood control reservoirs, except some pockets of transient water-logging. Drains and sewerage pipes dumping wastes in the Gulshan lake has been identified as major pollution problem by DWASA. The malodorous wastes tend to spill over when the roads are flooded.

Demography
As per 1991 Bangladesh census, 93.65% of the Gulshan population are Muslims.

Urban layout 

Thoroughfares in the area are beautified by major cellphone companies of Bangladesh. There are 25 mosques in this area, including Gulshan Azad Mosque and Banani Bazaar Mosque. The area features a number of churches and Christian missions, including that of the Missionaries of Charity.

Commercial activities

Many local and multinational companies have their local headquarters located in Gulshan, including Nokia, Grameenphone, Banglalink, Augere, Standard Chartered Bank, P&G, GSK, Reckitt Benckiser, Mahindra & Mahindra Ltd., The Himalaya Drug Company, Siemens, Nokia Siemens Networks, Sony Ericsson, Ericsson, Coca-Cola, PepsiCo, The Coca-Cola Company and Microsoft.

There are some 45 boutiques, markets, bazaars and shopping centers in Gulshan. There also are mega-stores such as Nandan, Agora, Aarong, Unimart, Meena Baazar and Lavender. There are also many shopping mall like Shopper's World, Pink City and the ABC Shopping Complex. A plethora of food, bank and fashion outlets are located all over the area.

Entertainment

The area hosts a number of private clubs. While the Gulshan Club and International Club have their own policies, most of the rest are sponsored by the various diplomatic missions. These include the American Recreation Association (American Club), the Canadian Club, the Dutch Club, the Australian Club (membership also available to New Zealanders), the Nordic Club (membership available to citizens of Scandinavian countries) and the German Club (membership available to EU citizens). The BAGHA (British Aid Guest House Association) Club falls under the British High Commission umbrella and also accepts membership from EU citizens. While it is not a club as such, the quarters of the American Embassy's Marine Guard unit maintains a small private bar.

There is a 250-room five star hotel, Westin, located at circle-2.

Health

The headquarters of icddr,b is in Mahakhali. Gulshan Mother and Child Clinic (Gulshan Maa O Shishu Clinic), Gulshan Group Clinic, Retina and Eye Center, DNS Diagnostics and Telemedicine, Sikder's Women's Hospital, Ear Care Center, and Balaka Pharmacy are in Gulshan Model Town. The Dental Studio, Sarah Dental Clinic, and Johnson's Dental Clinic are in Banani Model Town. The Apollo Hospital is in Bashundhara. There also Japan Bangladesh Friendship Hospital in Gulshan, Aysha Memorial Specialized Hospital and LifeLine in Mohakhali, and Nova Medical Center, Peerless Diagnostic & Treatment Centre and Prince Medical Center in Banani. There also Midway Clinic, Adventist Dental Clinic, Modern Clinic & Blood Center and Shifa Pharmacy in Gulshan, Christian Medical Hospital in Baridhara, and Metropolitan Medical Center and Marie Stopes Clinic in Mohakhali.

Diplomatic missions 

 Embassy of the Islamic Republic of Afghanistan
 Australian High Commission
 Embassy of the Kingdom of Belgium
 Royal Bhutanese Embassy
 Canadian High Commission
 Embassy of the People's Republic of China
 Royal Danish Embassy
 Embassy of the Arab Republic of Egypt
 Embassy of the Republic of France
 Embassy of the Federal Republic of Germany
 Embassy of the Republic of Hungary
 Embassy of the Republic of Indonesia
 Embassy of the Republic of Italy
 Embassy of the State of Kuwait
 The People's Bureau of the Great Socialist People's Libyan Arab Jamahiriya
 Malaysian High Commission
 Embassy of the Union of Myanmar
 Royal Netherlands Embassy
 Royal Norwegian Embassy
 High Commission for the Islamic Republic of Pakistan

 Embassy of the State of Palestine
 Embassy of the Republic of the Philippines
 Embassy of the Republic of Poland
 Embassy of the State of Qatar
 Embassy of the Russian Federation
 Embassy of Romania
 Embassy of Saudi Arabia
 Office of the Saudi Military Attache
 Dawa Office, The Royal Embassy of Saudi Arabia
 Consulate of the Republic of Singapore
 Embassy of the Kingdom of Spain
 The High Commission of the Democratic Socialist Republic of Sri Lanka
 Embassy of Sweden
 Royal Thai Embassy
 Embassy of the Republic of Turkey
 Embassy of the United Arab Emirates
 British High Commission
 Embassy of the United States of America
 Consular Agency of the Republic of Uzbekistan
 Delegation of the European Commission

Source: Embassy World

Education

Universities 

 The International University of Scholars
 BRAC University
 Southeast University 
 Northern University Bangladesh
 Manarat International University
 Presidency University

 Prime Asia University
 Queens University (Bangladesh)
 Royal University of Dhaka
 Sonargaon University (SU)
 Universal College Bangladesh
 University of Information Technology & Sciences
 University of South Asia
 ZNRF University of Management Sciences (ZUMS)

Schools 

 Australian International School Dhaka
 Government Titumir College
 Oxford International School, Gulshan Campus
 Manarat Dhaka International School and College
 Lakehead Grammar School
 Scholastica
 Sir John Wilson School

Gallery

References

External links
 Ward 19 , Prothom Alo (Bengali)

Thanas of Dhaka
Planned cities in Bangladesh